The Book of Nehemiah in the Hebrew Bible, largely takes the form of a first-person memoir concerning the rebuilding of the walls of Jerusalem after the Babylonian exile by Nehemiah, a Jew who is a high official at the Persian court, and the dedication of the city and its people to God's laws (Torah). Since the 16th century, it has generally been treated as a separate book within the Bible. Before that date, it had been included in the Book of Ezra; but in Latin Christian Bibles from the 13th century onwards, the Vulgate Book of Ezra was divided into two texts, called respectively the First and Second books of Ezra; a separation which became canonised with the first printed bibles in Hebrew and Latin. Mid 16th century Reformed Protestant Bible translations produced in Geneva were the first to introduce the name 'Book of Nehemiah' for the text formerly called the 'Second Book of Ezra'.

Summary 
The events take place in the second half of the 5th century BC. Listed together with the Book of Ezra as Ezra–Nehemiah, it represents the final chapter in the historical narrative of the Hebrew Bible.

The original core of the book, the first-person memoir, may have been combined with the core of the Book of Ezra around 400 BC. Further editing probably continued into the Hellenistic era.

The book tells how Nehemiah, at the court of the king in Susa, is informed that Jerusalem is without walls, and resolves to restore them. The king appoints him as governor of Judah and he travels to Jerusalem. There he rebuilds the walls, despite the opposition of Israel's enemies, and reforms the community in conformity with the law of Moses. After 12 years in Jerusalem, he returns to Susa but subsequently revisits Jerusalem. He finds that the Israelites have been backsliding and taking non-Jewish wives, and he stays in Jerusalem to enforce the Law.
 In the 20th year of Artaxerxes I of Persia, Nehemiah, cup-bearer to the King in Susa (the Persian capital), learns that the wall of Jerusalem is destroyed. He prays to God, recalling the sins of Israel and God's promise of restoration to the Land, and asks Artaxerxes for leave to return to Jerusalem and rebuild its walls; the king is receptive and extends his aid to this mission.
 Nehemiah returns to Jerusalem, carrying letters of authorisation from the king; he inspects the walls.
 Nehemiah and the Jews (including the 'High Priest' Eliashib), begin rebuilding Jerusalem.
 The enemies of the Jews – Sanballat of Samaria, Tobiah the Ammonite, Geshem the Arab, and the men of Ashdod – plot to attack Jerusalem which necessitates the Jews working with weapons in their hands.
 Nehemiah sees that the Jewish nobles are oppressing the poor, and forces the cancellation of all debt and mortgages; while previous governors have been corrupt and oppressive, he has been righteous and just.
 Sanballat accuses Nehemiah of planning rebellion against Artaxerxes, and he is opposed even by Jewish nobles and prophets, but the wall is completed.
 Nehemiah appoints officials and sets guards on the wall and gates; he plans to register the Jews, and finds the Census of those who had returned earlier.
 Nehemiah assembles the people and has Ezra read to them the law-book of Moses; Nehemiah, Ezra and the Levites institute the Feast of Booths, in accordance with the Law.
 The Jews assemble in penance and prayer, recalling their past sins, God's help to them, and his promise of the land.
 The priests, Levites and the Israelite people enter into a covenant, agreeing to separate themselves from the surrounding peoples and to keep the Law.
 Jerusalem is repopulated by the Jews living in the towns and villages of Judah and Benjamin.
 A list of priests and Levites who returned in the days of Cyrus (the first returnees from Babylon) is presented; Nehemiah, aided by Ezra, oversees the dedication of the walls and the rebuilt city.
 After 12 years Nehemiah returns to Susa; he later comes back to Jerusalem, and finds that there has been backsliding in his absence. He takes measures to enforce his earlier reforms and asks for God's favour.

Historical background 
The book is set in the 5th century BC. Judah is one of several provinces within a larger satrapy (a large administrative unit) within the Achaemenid Empire. The capital of the empire is at Susa. Nehemiah is a cup-bearer to king Artaxerxes I of Persia – an important official position.

At his own request Nehemiah is sent to Jerusalem as governor of Yehud, the official Persian name for Judah. Jerusalem had been conquered and destroyed by the Babylonians in 586 BC and Nehemiah finds it still in ruins. His task is to rebuild the walls and to re-populate the city. He faces opposition from three powerful neighbours, the Samaritans, the Ammonites, and the Arabs, as well as the city of Ashdod, but manages to rebuild the walls. He then purifies the Jewish community by enforcing its segregation from its neighbours and enforces the laws of Moses.

Textual history 

The single Hebrew book Ezra–Nehemiah, with title "Ezra", was translated into Greek around the middle of the 2nd century BC.  Slightly later a second, and very different Greek translation was made, in the form of 1 Esdras, from which the deeds of Nehemiah are entirely absent, those sections either being omitted or re-attributed to Ezra instead; and initially early Christians reckoned this later translation as their biblical 'Book of Ezra', as had the 1st century Jewish writer Josephus. From the third century the Christian Old Testament in Greek supplemented the text of 1 Esdras with the older translation of Ezra-Nehemiah, naming the two books Esdras A and Esdras B respectively; and this usage is noted by the 3rd century Christian scholar Origen, who remarked that the Hebrew 'book of Ezra' might then be considered a 'double' book. Jerome, writing in the early 5th century, noted that this duplication had since been adopted by Greek and Latin Christians. Jerome himself rejected the duplication in his Vulgate translation of the Bible into Latin from the Hebrew; and consequently all early Vulgate manuscripts present Ezra-Nehemiah as a single book, as too does the 8th century commentary of Bede, and the 9th century bibles of Alcuin and Theodulf of Orleans. However, sporadically from the 9th century onwards, Latin bibles are found that separate the Ezra and Nehemiah sections of Ezra-Nehemiah as two distinct books, then called the first and second books of Ezra; and this becomes standard in the Paris Bibles of the 13th century. It was not until 1516/17, in the first printed Rabbinic Bible of Daniel Bomberg that the separation was introduced generally in Hebrew Bibles.

In later medieval Christian commentary, this book is referred to as the 'second book of Ezra', and never as the 'Book of Nehemiah"; equally citations from this book are always introduced as "Ezra says..", and never as 'Nehemiah says..".

Composition and date 
The combined book Ezra–Nehemiah of the earliest Christian and Jewish period was known as Ezra and was probably attributed to Ezra himself; according to a rabbinic tradition, however, Nehemiah was the real author but was forbidden to claim authorship because of his bad habit of disparaging others.

The Nehemiah Memorial, chapters 1–7 and 11–13, may have circulated as an independent work before being combined with the Ezra material to form Ezra–Nehemiah. Determining the composition of the Memorial depends on the dates of Nehemiah's mission: It is commonly accepted that "Artaxerxes" was Artaxerxes I (there were two later kings of the same name), and that Nehemiah's first period in Jerusalem was therefore 445–433 BC; allowing for his return to Susa and second journey to Jerusalem, the end of the 5th century BC is therefore the earliest possible date for the Memorial. The Nehemiah Memorial is interrupted by chapters 8–10, which concern Ezra. These have sometimes been identified as another, separate work, the Ezra Memorial (EM), but other scholars believe the EM to be fictional and heavily altered by later editors. Both the Nehemiah and Ezra material are combined with numerous lists, Censuses and other material.

The first edition of the combined Ezra–Nehemiah may date from the early 4th century BC; further editing continued well into the following centuries.

See also
Esdras
Ezra-Nehemiah

References

External links 

Commentaries
 Blenkinsopp, Joseph, "Ezra-Nehemiah: A Commentary" (Eerdmans, 1988)
 Coggins, R.J., "The Books of Ezra and Nehemiah" (Cambridge University Press, 1976)
Ecker, Ronald L., "Ezra and Nehemiah" (Ecker's Biblical Web Pages, 2007)
 Fensham, F. Charles, "The books of Ezra and Nehemiah" (Eerdmans, 1982)
 Grabbe, L.L., "Ezra-Nehemiah" (Routledge, 1998)
 Throntveit, Mark A., "Ezra-Nehemiah" (John Knox Press, 1992)

Other
 Clements, R.E. (ed), "The World of Ancient Israel" (Cambridge University Press, 1989)
 Blenkinsopp, Joseph, "Judaism, the first phase" (Eerdmans, 2009)
 Garbini, G., "Myth and history in the bible" (Sheffield Academic Press, 2003)
 Grabbe, L.L., "A history of the Jews and Judaism in the Second Temple Period, Volume 1" (T&T Clark, 2004)
 Graham, M.P, and McKenzie, Steven L., "The Hebrew Bible today: an introduction to critical issues" (Westminster John Knox Press, 1998)
 Pakkala, Juha, "Ezra the scribe: the development of Ezra 7–10 and Nehemiah 8" (Walter de Gryter, 2004)

Translations
 Bible Gateway (opens at NIV version)
 Chabad.org Library
  Various versions

 
5th-century BC books
Nehemiah
Nehemiah
Historical books